Kim Erica Richards (born September 19, 1964) is an American actress, socialite, and television personality. She began her career as a child actress, and rose to prominence from her roles in Nanny and the Professor, Escape to Witch Mountain, and Return from Witch Mountain.  In 2010, Richards appeared as a main cast member on The Real Housewives of Beverly Hills alongside her sister Kyle Richards. She was part of the main cast for the first five seasons and has returned for guest appearances in subsequent seasons.

Early life
Richards was born September 19, 1964, in Mineola, New York, the daughter of Kathleen Mary (née Dugan) and her second husband, Kenneth Edwin Richards. They separated in 1972 and her mother later remarried. Her younger sister is actress, socialite, and television personality Kyle Richards. Socialite Kathy Hilton is her half-sister, from her mother's prior marriage to Larry Avanzino, and her nieces include Nicky and Paris Hilton. Richards is of Welsh and Irish ancestry.

Career
Richards' career began when she was months old and appeared in a TV commercial for Firth Carpet. From 1970 to 1971, she starred as Prudence Everett in the television series Nanny and the Professor. She also starred in several Disney films, including Escape to Witch Mountain, No Deposit, No Return, and Return from Witch Mountain.

In 1974 and 1976, Richards appeared in Disney's Whiz Kid Capers series (The Whiz Kid and the Mystery at Riverton and The Whiz Kid and the Carnival Caper), two television movies that aired as part of The Wonderful World of Disney anthology series.

Richards and her sister Kyle played sisters in the thriller film The Car (1977). She teamed up once again with Witch Mountain co-star Ike Eisenmann in the made-for-television movie Devil Dog: The Hound of Hell (1978). In the 1976 film Assault on Precinct 13, she played a young girl who was brutally murdered when a gang member fired a round into her chest. She later starred in the short-lived television series Hello, Larry (1979-80) and appeared as a guest on numerous episodes of American television shows, including Emergency!, Diff'rent Strokes, Alice, Fantasy Island, The Love Boat, CHiPs, Magnum, P.I., James at 16, The Dukes of Hazzard, The Rockford Files, and Little House on the Prairie as Olga Nordstrom. 

As a young adult, she appeared in Meatballs Part II (1984) and Tuff Turf (1985). in 1990, she co-produced the film Escape, along with then-husband G. Monty Brinson.

Richards appeared in a supporting role as Christina Ricci's estranged mother in Black Snake Moan (2006). She made a cameo appearance in Race to Witch Mountain (2009), playing a waitress named Tina, a minor variation from the character Tia she played in the franchise's 1975 and 1978 films.

In 2010, Richards began appearing as a regular cast member of The Real Housewives of Beverly Hills, alongside her sister Kyle. After five seasons, Kim was let go as a full-time cast member following her personal struggles. She returned as a guest star, though, in the show's sixth, seventh, ninth, and tenth seasons.

Personal life
In 1985, Richards married Monty Brinson, a supermarket-franchise heir who later became a professional poker player. They have one daughter together, Brooke Ashley (born February 21, 1986).

Brinson and Richards divorced amicably in 1988. Later that year, she married Gregg Davis, the son of petroleum mogul Marvin Davis and his wife Barbara Davis. They have two children together: a daughter, Whitney Nicole Davis (born March 16, 1990) and a son, Chad Austin Davis (born May 26, 1991). Richards and Davis divorced in 1991.

Following her separation from Davis, Richards dated commodities salesman John J. Collett, a central figure in a criminal scheme involving 8,000 elderly investors and nearly US$150 million (equivalent to $ million in ) in losses. On October 28, 1991, he was murdered outside Brent's Deli in Northridge. He was shot twice in the head at point-blank range by a hit man who had been paid US$30,000. He was speaking with Kim on the phone when the shooting occurred. Richards spoke about Collett's murder on an episode of The Real Housewives of Beverly Hills.

After Collett's death, Richards was in a relationship with aircraft-parts supplier John Jackson from 1992 to 1996. She gave birth to their daughter, Kimberly Collette Jackson, on August 23, 1995.

From 2012 to 2018, she was in a relationship with businessman Wynn Katz. They appeared together on WE TV's Marriage Boot Camp in 2018, and split after their appearance on the show.

On April 15, 2015, Richards was arrested and charged with trespassing, public intoxication, resisting an officer, and battery on a police officer at the Beverly Hills Hotel. She spent the night in Los Angeles County Jail and was released the next morning on bail of US$20,000. She was arrested again on August 2, 2015, for allegedly shoplifting at a San Fernando Valley Target department store, was booked into the Van Nuys jail, and was released on August 3 after posting bail of US$5,000.

Richards remained close friends with first husband Brinson and helped care for him during his struggle with lung cancer, which eventually caused his death on January 25, 2016 at age 58.

Richards has two grandsons through her oldest daughter Brooke and husband, Thayer Wiederhorn: Hucksley Andrew Wiederhorn (born September 28, 2016) and Hunter Montgomery Wiederhorn (born April 18, 2019).

Filmography

References

External links
 
 

Living people
1964 births
People from Mineola, New York
20th-century American actresses
21st-century American actresses
Actresses from New York (state)
American people of Irish descent
American people of Welsh descent
American child actresses
American film actresses
The Real Housewives cast members
Conrad Hilton family
Richards family
Davis family